The Himalayan College of Agricultural Sciences & Technology (HICAST) was established by a group of agricultural processionals in the leadership of Dr Binayak P Rajbhandari in 2000 in Nepal. The concept based on public private partnership approach was that of Dr Binayak P. Rajbhandari. The college is intended to teach and make contributions in all fields of knowledge in agricultural and applied sciences, from the farmer's intuitive knowledge to the sciences, and from the theoretical knowledge to the applied fields. It runs with a Mantra 'Agricultural Revolution through Quality Education'. New blocks of the college are constructed in Kirtipur city.

External links
 Official site

Agricultural universities and colleges in Nepal
2000 establishments in Nepal